George Lott and John Van Ryn were the defending champions, but Lott did not compete. Van Ryn competed with Wilmer Allison, but lost in the semifinals to Jacques Brugnon and Henri Cochet.

Borotra and Brugnon defeated Pat Hughes and Fred Perry in the final, 6–0, 4–6, 3–6, 7–5, 7–5 to win the gentlemen's doubles tennis title at the 1932 Wimbledon Championship.

Seeds

  Wilmer Allison /  John Van Ryn (semifinals)
  Jack Crawford /  Harry Hopman (third round)
  Pat Hughes /  Fred Perry (final)
  Jean Borotra /  Jacques Brugnon (champions)

Draw

Finals

Top half

Section 1

Section 2

Bottom half

Section 3

Section 4

References

External links

Men's Doubles
Wimbledon Championship by year – Men's doubles